Ilha de Ferro ( Iron Island) is a Brazilian drama streaming television series created by Max Mallmann and Adriana Lunardi for Globoplay. Directed by Afonso Poyart, and produced by TV Globo's production division Estúdios Globo, it premiered on the streaming service on November 14, 2018.

The series follows the story of a team of oil tankers workers that are divided between the dilemmas of their personal life on land and working on the high seas. It is the last credited work of Mallmann, who died some months prior to the series' premiere.

Premise 
Dante (Cauã Reymond) is the production coordinator of PLT-137, an oil rig known for its accidents history. He dreams of becoming manager of the oil rig, but is angry when he realizes he needs to compete with the newcomer Julia (Maria Casadevall) for the job. However, it is in the midst of this dispute that ends up a passion between the two able to change the course of their lives.

Cast

Main 
 Maria Casadevall as Júlia
 Cauã Reymond as Dante
 Herbert Richers Jr. as Horácio Bravo
 Taumaturgo Ferreira as Buda
 Klebber Toledo as Bruno (main, seasons 1; guest, season 2)
 Sophie Charlotte as Leona (season 1)
 Mariana Ximenes as Dr. Olívia Mossen (season 2)
 Daphne Bozaski as Maria Eduarda Giordano (season 2)
 Eriberto Leão as Diogo Bravo (season 2)
 Rômulo Estrela as Ramiro (season 2)

Recurring and guests 
 Cássia Kis as Isabel
 Osmar Prado as João Bravo
 Jonathan Azevedo as Fiapo
 Milhem Cortaz as Astério
 Moacyr Franco as Amorim
 Bruce Gomlevsky as Leviatã

Production
The filming of the first season of the series ended on May 12, 2018, in Rio de Janeiro. A reproduction of the oil extraction platform was built at the Globo Studios.

Release
The series had its first season of 12 episodes released at Globoplay on November 14, 2018.

Episodes

Season 1 (2018)

Season 2 (2019)

References

External links

2018 Brazilian television series debuts
2010s Brazilian television series
Brazilian drama television series
Portuguese-language television shows
Television shows set in Rio de Janeiro (city)
Globoplay original programming
Works about petroleum